Earle High School is an accredited public high school in Earle, Arkansas, United States. Earle High School is one of four public high schools in Crittenden County and the only high school of the Earle School District. Earle High School was damaged May 2, 2008, by a part of a series of deadly tornadoes.

Academics
The assumed course of study follows the Smart Core curriculum developed by the Arkansas Department of Education (ADE). Students complete regular coursework and exams and may select Advanced Placement (AP) courses and exams that may lead to college credit. AP classes are offered in English, Mathematics, Science and Social Studies.  Students are also afforded concurrent enrollment at Mid-South Community College in nearby West Memphis.  College credits from this program are accepted for transfer to all state colleges and universities in Arkansas.  Twenty-four credits are required for graduation.

Established prior to 1909, Earle High School is accredited by the ADE and has been accredited by AdvancED (formerly North Central Association) since 1925.

Athletics
The Earle High School mascot is the Bulldog with cardinal and white serving as the school colors.

For 2012–14, the Earle Bulldogs compete in the 3A Classification from the 3A Region 3 Conference administered by the Arkansas Activities Association. The Bulldogs participate in football, basketball (boys/girls), tennis (boys/girls), track (boys/girls).

History

Old Earle High School 
Old Earle High School served as the city's high school between 1919 and 1978.

References

External links
 

1909 establishments in Arkansas
Educational institutions established in 1909
Memphis metropolitan area
Public high schools in Arkansas
Schools in Crittenden County, Arkansas